George Hyde may refer to:
 George E. Hyde (1882–1968), U.S. historian of the American Indians
 George Gordon Hyde (1883–1946), Quebec (Canada) provincial politician and lawyer
 George Hyde (admiral) (1877–1937), Australian admiral
 George Hyde (RAF officer) (1893–?), English World War I flying ace
 George Hyde (bishop) (1923–2010), American clergyman
 George Hyde (gun designer) (1888–1963), American machinist, gunsmith, and gun designer
 George Hyde (Knight of the Bath) (1570–1623), Berkshire MP
 George Hyde (athlete) (1905–1974), Australian long-distance runner
 George Hyde (politician), mayor of pre-statehood San Francisco, California